Dona Mason is an American country musician, best known as the last African American woman to appear on the Billboard Country chart until the 20-year gap was broken by Rissi Palmer in 2007. In 1987, Mason performed as a vocalist on Danny Davis's cover version of "Green Eyes (Cryin’ Those Blue Tears)", which peaked on Billboard’s Hot Country chart at #62 in 1987.

References

African-American country musicians